Abdul Dayyan bin Mohamed Jaffar (born 13 September 1993) is a Singaporean archer who participated at the 2010 Summer Youth Olympics in his home city. He was eliminated in the quarterfinals of the individual event by Gregor Rajh. He paired up with Begünhan Ünsal of Turkey and won bronze in the mixed team event.

References

External links 
 

1993 births
Living people
Singaporean male archers
Archers at the 2010 Summer Youth Olympics